Edward Żuławnik (23 November 1932 – 1 September 1999) was a Polish wrestler. He competed in the men's Greco-Roman welterweight at the 1960 Summer Olympics.

References

1932 births
1999 deaths
Polish male sport wrestlers
Olympic wrestlers of Poland
Wrestlers at the 1960 Summer Olympics
People from Płońsk County
Sportspeople from Masovian Voivodeship